Biphasic, meaning having two phases, may refer to:

 Phase (matter), in the physical sciences, a biphasic system, e.g. one involving liquid water and steam
 Biphasic sleep, a nap or siesta in addition to the usual sleep episode at night
 Phase (pharmacology)
 Biphasic disease
 Biphasic formulations of oral contraceptive pills

See also
 Biphase (disambiguation)
 Phase (disambiguation)